Fake nude photography refers to nude photographs created to appear as actual nudes of an individual. Several reasons for the creation of these doctored photographs include sexual gratification, stigmatization or embarrassment of the subject, or for commercial gain, such as by selling the photographs on pornography websites. Fakes can be created using image editing software or through machine learning (fake pornographic images created this way are referred to as deepfakes).
 
Many websites host fake nude and pornographic photos of celebrities, which are sometimes referred to as celebrity fakes. Magazines such as Celebrity Skin, which published paparazzi shots and illicitly obtained nude photos, have been cited as precursors to this phenomenon. In the 1990s and 2000s, fake nude images of celebrities proliferated on Usenet and other websites, leading to campaigns to take legal action against the creators of the images and websites dedicated to determining the veracity of nude photos. "Deepfakes", which use artificial neural networks to superimpose a person's face into a pornographic image or video, were popularized in the late 2010s, leading to concerns about the technology's use in fake news and revenge porn.

Purposes
 

The reasons for the creation of nude photos may range from a need to discredit the target publicly, personal hatred for the target, or the promise of pecuniary gains for such work on the part of the creator of such photos.
 
Fake nude photos often target prominent figures such as businesspeople or politicians. This is the case for candidate for Rwanda's presidential election in 2017, Diane Rwigara.

Notable cases

In 2010, 97 people were arrested in Korea after spreading fake nude pictures of the group Girls' Generation on the internet. In 2011, a 53-year-old Incheon man was arrested after spreading more fake pictures of the same group.
 
In 2012, South Korean police identified 157 Korean artists of whom fake nudes were circulating.
 
In 2012, when Liu Yifei's fake nude photography released on the network, Liu Yifei Red Star Land Company declared a legal search to find out who created and released the photos.
 
In the same year, Chinese actor Huang Xiaoming released nude photos that sparked public controversy, but they were ultimately proven to be real pictures.
 
In 2014, supermodel Kate Upton angrily threatened to sue a website for posting her fake nude photos. Previously, in 2011, this page was threatened by Taylor Swift.
 
In November 2014, singer Bi Rain was angry because of a fake nude photo that spread throughout the internet. Information reveals that: "Rain's nude photo was released from Kim Tae-hee's lost phone." Rain's label, Cube Entertainment, stated that the person in the nude photo is not Rain and the company has since stated that it will take strict legal action against those who post photos together with false comments.
 
In July 2018, Seoul police launched an investigation after a fake nude photo of President Moon Jae-in was posted on the website of the Korean radical feminist group WOMAD.
 
In early 2019, Alexandria Ocasio-Cortez, a Democratic politician, was berated by other political parties over a fake nude photo of her in the bathroom. The picture created a huge wave of media controversy in the United States.

Methods
Fake nude images can be created using image editing software or neural network applications.
There are two basic alternative methods::
 Combine and superimpose existing images onto source images, adding the face of the subject onto a nude model.
 Remove clothes from the source image to make it look like a nude photo.

Impact

Images of this type may have a negative psychological impact on the victims and may be used for extortion purposes.

See also
 Nude photography
 Glamour photography
 Deepfake
 Voyeurism

References

Further reading
 Forbes, chapter 169, no 1–6, p. 84, Bertie Charles, Forbes Incorporated, 2002, California university.
 American Journalism Review: AJR., chapter 18, no 1–5, p. 29, College of Journalism of the University of Maryland at College Park, 1996
 Hana S. Noor Al-Deen, John Allen Hendricks, Social Media: Usage and Impact, p. 248, Lexington Books, 2012.
 Janet Staiger, Media Reception Studies, p. 124, NYU Press, 1 July 2005
 Kola Boof, Diary of a Lost Girl: The Autobiography of Kola Boof, p. 305, Door of Kush, 2006.
 Laurence O'Toole, Pornocopia: porn, sex, technology and desire, p. 279, Serpent's Tail, 1999

Nude photography
Nudity
Computer graphics
Pornography
Photography forgeries
Photographic techniques
Applications of computer vision
Applications of artificial intelligence